

The Bali Bombings Memorial is a permanent memorial in central London to victims of the 2002 bombings in Bali, Indonesia. It was designed by Gary Breeze and the carving was undertaken by Martin Cook and Gary Breeze. It was unveiled on 12 October 2006, the fourth anniversary of the bombings, by the Prince of Wales and the Duchess of Cornwall, at a ceremony attended by relatives and friends of the 28 British victims.

The memorial commemorates the victims of all nationalities, with those from Britain listed apart at the centre of the inscription, which covers one side of a Portland stone wall. Standing near this wall is a granite globe with 202 doves carved across its surface. Martin Cook explained its symbolism thus: "All of the 202 doves are unique, to represent each life lost and as symbols for peace. The globe shows how the victims came from all parts of the world and how indiscriminate terrorism is".

The memorial is located at Clive Steps, near the King Charles Street entrance of the Foreign and Commonwealth Office building, and faces St. James's Park. A site near the Foreign Office was requested by the United Kingdom Bali Bombings Victims' Group, as a reminder to the British government of its failure to give adequate warning of the terrorist threat in Indonesia prior to the bombings. The government gave £100,000 towards the cost of the memorial.

Gallery

See also
 2006 in art
 Statue of Robert Clive, London, located nearby

References

External links
 

2002 Bali bombings
2006 establishments in England
2006 sculptures
Sculptures of birds
Granite sculptures in the United Kingdom
Monuments and memorials in London
Outdoor sculptures in London
City of Westminster
Whitehall